Bram Appelo (born 10 July 1984) is a Dutch motorcycle racer.

Career statistics

Grand Prix motorcycle racing

By season

Races by year
(key)

References

External links
Profile on MotoGP.com
Profile on WorldSBK.com

1984 births
Living people
Dutch motorcycle racers
250cc World Championship riders
Sportspeople from Deventer
FIM Superstock 1000 Cup riders
21st-century Dutch people